Jacques Baudrier (born 4 May 1872, date of death unknown) was a French sailor who represented his country at the 1900 Summer Olympics in Meulan, France. With crew Félix Marcotte, William Martin, Jules Valton and Jean Le Bret. Baudrier,  as helmsman, took the second place in first race of the 0.5 to 1 ton and finished third in the second race.

Baudrier also took, as helmsman, the bronze medal in the first race of the 1 to 2 ton and the 4th place in the second race of the 1 to 2 ton.

Further reading

References

External links

 

1872 births
Year of death missing
French male sailors (sport)
Sailors at the 1900 Summer Olympics – .5 to 1 ton
Sailors at the 1900 Summer Olympics – 1 to 2 ton
Olympic sailors of France
Medalists at the 1900 Summer Olympics
Sportspeople from Paris
Olympic silver medalists for France
Olympic bronze medalists for France
Olympic medalists in sailing
Sailors at the 1900 Summer Olympics – Open class